Crenicichla vaillanti is a species of cichlid native to South America. It is found in the Essequibo and Mana River basins.

The fish is named in honor of Pellegrin’s mentor and boss, Léon Vaillant (1834-1914) a zoologist at the Muséum national d’Histoire naturelle in Paris.

References

Kullander, S.O., 2003. Cichlidae (Cichlids). p. 605-654. In R.E. Reis, S.O. Kullander and C.J. Ferraris, Jr. (eds.) Checklist of the Freshwater Fishes of South and Central America. Porto Alegre: EDIPUCRS, Brasil. 

vaillanti
Taxa named by Jacques Pellegrin
Fish described in 1904